Lulu Wang (born February 25, 1983) is a Chinese-born American filmmaker. She is best known for writing and directing the comedy-drama films Posthumous (2014) and The Farewell (2019). For the latter, she received the Independent Spirit Award for Best Film and the film was named one of the top ten films of 2019 by the American Film Institute. Wang has also written, produced, and directed several short films, documentaries, and music videos.

Early life and education
Wang was born in Beijing. Her father Haiyan Wang was a Chinese diplomat to the USSR and her mother Jian Yu is a former cultural critic and editor at the Beijing Literary Gazette. She has a younger brother, Anthony. Wang spent her early years in Beijing with her parents and briefly lived with her paternal grandmother for a year in Changchun, Jilin, before emigrating to Miami at age 6 because her father was pursuing a PhD at the University of Miami.

She is a classically trained pianist, starting lessons at age four and attending the New World School of the Arts. Her parents encouraged her to become a professional pianist; her mother took her to a local church in Miami every day to practice before they were able to buy a piano for her. Wang ultimately decided against a career in music when she was at college.

Wang studied music and literature at Boston College from 2001 and graduated in 2005 with a double major in literature and music. Wang says she was inspired to become a filmmaker after watching Steven Shainberg's 2002 film Secretary in her senior year. She then took two film production courses and made several short films while still at college. After learning the art of film and producing a few short student films and documentaries, Wang moved to Hollywood in 2007 to fully pursue her love for writing.

Career

2005–2007: Beginnings
Filmmaking found itself early in Wang's career, but instead of movie theaters her content was exhibited in courtrooms. Shown for mediation and court cases, she created short “day in the life” videos for legal firms for her startup business, capturing injured victims’ daily struggles in mundane activities. She interviewed many clients and their families in an attempt to show the extent of their injuries.

In 2005, while still a student, Wang received the Best Beginning Film Award at the Boston College Baldwin Awards for Storyteller, which she made together with fellow Boston College student Tony Hale. They went on to win the Baldwin Award for Best Picture for the short film Pisces at the Boston College Baldwin Film Festival the following year. Wang and Hale also collaborated on the 2006 documentary short, Fishing the Gulf, on over-fishing in Panama. Her next project was the 2007 short film Can-Can, based on a short story by Arturo Vivante about marriage and infidelity.

2008–2015: Posthumous and breakthrough
In 2008, shortly after moving to Los Angeles, Wang interned for a producer alongside Bernadette Bürgi. After a trip to IKEA, the two decided to make a film together due to their mutual affection for storytelling and romantic comedies. Wang and Bürgi set up their own production company Flying Box Productions; Wang directed multiple web shorts and music videos and, in 2014, her first feature film, Posthumous. Set in Berlin, Germany, Posthumous is an American-German co-production starring Brit Marling and Jack Huston. Wang was so dedicated to having Huston in the film, she wrote a heartfelt letter to him, which he later admitted was the reason he signed on to the first-time writer/director's project. The film debuted at the Zurich Film Festival on 4 October 2014, played in the U.S. at the Miami International Film Festival, and has been released worldwide.

In 2014, Wang was awarded the Chaz and Roger Ebert Directing Fellowship at the Film Independent Spirit Awards. The same year, she was chosen as a Film Independent Project Involve Directing Fellow. Wang's 2015 short film Touch premiered at the Palm Springs International ShortFest. Touch was an NBCU Short Film Festival finalist, was selected by the American Cinematheque for its Annual Focus on Female Directors, and won Best Drama at the Asians on Film Festival.

2016–present: The Farewell and acclaim
In May 2016, Wang wrote and narrated a story, "What You Don't Know", for the radio program This American Life. Later that year, development began on a feature film based on the story with producer Chris Weitz, who had heard it on the radio. In 2017, Wang was chosen to participate in Sundance Institute’s FilmTwo Initiative, which provides guidance for filmmakers creating their second feature films.

In January 2019, Wang's second feature film, The Farewell, premiered at the Sundance Film Festival, where it was picked up for worldwide distribution by A24. The film follows struggling New York City artist Billi (played by Awkwafina in her first dramatic role), who travels to China for a family reunion to visit her dying grandmother. The family has decided to keep the truth about her condition a secret from Nai Nai (Mandarin for "grandmother") and sets up a wedding as a pretense for their reunion. Wang based the film on her own grandmother's illness, which also included her family setting up a wedding as a pretense; the film opens with a title card stating Based on an actual lie. The film is presented for the most part in Mandarin Chinese with English subtitles. It was filmed in the neighborhood where Wang's grandmother lived and Wang cast her actual great aunt Lu Hong to play herself in the film. After its Sundance premiere, numerous publications listed The Farewell as a standout at the festival, including Variety, Thrillist, and Rolling Stone.  Despite being an award winning film now, Lulu Wang struggled with American Financiers when pitching the movie The Farewell. It was suggested to Wang that she added a prominent white character into her movie and to switch the genre of the movie from drama to comedy. Even when pitching the movie to a Chinese financier, incorporating a white character was suggested. “People are so influenced by Hollywood” Wang says and she strived to break out that box by refusing to “whitewash” the film. 

In an IndieWire critics survey published after the festival, The Farewell was voted Best Film and Best Screenplay and Wang was voted Best Director. The film holds a 99% Critics Consensus rating on Rotten Tomatoes, based on 207 reviews.

In January 2019, Variety named Wang one of ten "Directors to Watch." In an interview with the publication, she described her next project as "very grounded science fiction."

The Farewell opened in limited release in four US theaters on July 12, 2019. The film opened to a gross of $351,330, averaging $87,833 per theater, surpassing the average of Avengers: Endgame which averaged $76,601 in 4,662 theaters for a gross of $357,115,007 on its opening weekend. The Farewell was released nationwide in the US on August 2, 2019.

The film attracted less interest in China, however, leading Variety to label it a box office "flop" in China, then the world's second-largest film market.

On December 4, 2019, the American Film Institute announced that The Farewell was one of that year's ten recipients of the 2019 AFI Awards for "films that are culturally and artistically representative" of 2019's "most significant achievements in the art of the moving image."

For her role as Billi, Awkwafina was awarded the Golden Globe Award for Best Actress in a Motion Picture – Musical or Comedy on January 5, 2020. The Farewell won the Independent Spirit Award for Best Feature at the 35th Independent Spirit Awards in Santa Monica, California on February 8, 2020. When awarded for her movie The Farewell, Wang dedicated her speech to talk about the lack of female director nominees. Wang states programs and encouragement are not "enough" and that the filmmaking industry needs to give women more jobs. Lulu Wang further emphasized the importance of making the same bets on female filmmakers as they do with male filmmakers.

On January 28, 2021 Apple released an 11-minute short film called Nian written and directed by Wang, celebrating the 2021 Chinese New Year. The short film was shot in its entirety using an iPhone 12 Pro Max.

Wang's next project is a film adaptation of Alexander Weinstein's collection of science fiction short stories, Children of the New World. She has said that the project "centers on questions of family."

Most recently, she, along with Dani Melia had launched Local Time Productions, with a first-look deal at Amazon Studios.

Personal life
Wang is fluent in English and Mandarin Chinese and also speaks some Spanish. She has been in a relationship with fellow filmmaker Barry Jenkins since 2018.

Her brother Anthony is a sous-chef at Eric Bost's restaurant Auburn in Los Angeles.

Filmmaking

Influences and approach 
Cinematic influences were limited for Wang's film The Farewell. Previewed in her roadblocks to find financiers, producing a narrative that authentically communicated the Asian immigrant experience was considered new territory and there were few to none “comps” or comparatives, to guarantee its success. Because there were few films with which to compare the narrative, Wang's main influences were her family. In an attempt to curate and maintain authenticity, she requested her father to read the script and repeatedly asked “does this feel like I am properly representing everyone”. Through his perspective, the mundaneness garnered questions about interest and why the narrative was not dramatized further to satiate Western audiences.

When filming The Farewell in particular, the autobiographical narrative required an inquisitional approach to writing and directing, forcing Wang to take on a role not dissimilar to a journalist in an attempt to extract the raw emotions her family members experienced in regards to maintaining the lie about Nai Nai's illness as well as the identity struggle of being a hyphenate.  In fact, amidst production Wang's family expressed uncertainty in her narrative claiming there are things she “doesn’t know enough about China to write the story”, evoking a sense of responsibility to research and interrogate further about her grandmother's history and her individual family members’ perspectives.  An interview process ensued in an attempt to absorb as much authenticity as possible, sometimes provoking painful memories. Lu Hong, Wang's real great aunt, was cast as herself, evoking palpable emotional conflict in her performance, but also giving feedback behind the screen on accuracy, easing ethical quandaries and providing emotional support.

Collaborators 
Wang's newest endeavor is an Amazon series in collaboration with producer and actress Nicole Kidman called “Expats”, based on the novel The Expatriates by Janice YK Lee. Bound by a sudden tragedy, three American women from Hong Kong form a complex bond that proves to be ever changing. Wang remarks on the series as an “examination of privilege, in many different ways whether it’s race, class, colorism” and expresses her excitement in the newly acquired creative freedom.

Filmography

Film

Television

Music videos

Awards and nominations

See also 

 List of Boston College people

References

External links 
 
 
 

1983 births
American women film directors
American women screenwriters
Chinese women film directors
Chinese women screenwriters
Morrissey College of Arts & Sciences alumni
Film directors from Beijing
Screenwriters from Beijing
Film directors from Florida
Writers from Miami
Sundance Film Festival award winners
People's Republic of China emigrants to the United States
21st-century American women writers
Living people